Christopher William Geere (born 18 March 1981) is an English actor. He is known for playing the lead role of Jimmy Shive-Overly in the FX and FXX dark comedy series You're the Worst and Roger Clifford in the 2019 film Detective Pikachu.

Career
Geere graduated from Guildford School of Acting and began his career on stage opposite Dame Judi Dench in Royal Shakespeare Company’s All’s Well That Ends Well.

Geere portrayed the character of Music and Drama teacher Matt Wilding in the BBC One school-based drama series Waterloo Road. In January 2009, just as the fourth series of Waterloo Road began airing, Geere said that he would not be returning for the fifth series.

Geere broke out to American audiences as Jimmy Shive-Overly, one half of the toxic and self-destructive couple at the heart of Stephen Falk’s critically acclaimed comedy You're the Worst for FX and FXX which received 4 Critic’s Choice nominations including Best Comedy. You're the Worst ran for five seasons from 2014 to 2019.

In 2019 Geere joined the global Pokémon universe as Roger Clifford in Legendary Entertainment/Universal Pictures live-action film Pokémon Detective Pikachu alongside Bill Nighy, Justice Smith and Ryan Reynolds.

Geere recurred on ABC’s Modern Family as Haley & then Alex’s love interest Professor Arvin Fennerman; as Joel, the well-meaning but hilariously toxic lead in BBC & Showtime’s dark comedic limited series, Ill Behaviour (TV series), opposite Tom Riley and Lizzy Caplan; Channel 4’s This Way Up (TV series) starring Sharon Horgan and Aisling Bea; The First Team (TV series) with Will Arnett; and on A Million Little Things as Allison Miller’s new roommate/love interest Jamie.

After recurring in season 5, Geere joined the cast of This Is Us as a series regular for their sixth and final season.

Personal life
Geere was born in Cambridge, Cambridgeshire. He married Jennifer Sawdon, a singer-songwriter and pianist, in 2010. Their son was born in 2012.

Filmography

Film

Television

References

External links

1981 births
21st-century English male actors
English male film actors
English male television actors
Living people
Male actors from Cambridgeshire
People from Cambridge
People from the City of Winchester